The National Elevation Dataset (NED) consists of high precision topography or ground surface elevation data (digital elevation model) for the United States. It was maintained by the USGS and all the data is in the public domain. Since the 3D Elevation Program came online, the NED was subsumed into The National Map as one of its layers of information.

Sources
The NED dataset is a compilation of data from a variety of existing high-precision datasets such as LiDAR data (see also National LIDAR Dataset - USA), contour maps, USGS DEM collection, SRTM and other sources which were reorganized and combined into a seamless dataset, designed to cover all the United States territory in its continuity.

Formats
Data is available in a few popular formats such as ESRI ArcGRID, GeoTIFF, BIL, GridFloat, and a few others.

A version of the NED called EDNA (Elevation Derivatives for National Applications) has been processed or "conditioned" for hydrologic applications. This is useful for hydrologic modeling, watershed delineation, or finding downstream flowpaths, "facilitating flood analysis investigations, pollution studies, estimations of annual streamflow, and hydroelectric power generation."

Precision
Depending on area location, the datasets are provided with 1/9 (about 3 meters), 1/3 (about 10 m) and 1-arcsecond (about 30 m) precision.

References

External links
 Elevation data in The National Map
 Shaded Relief Maps of the United States

Cartography
Digital elevation models